Chavali Venkata Arvind Krishna Sarma (born 5 January 1985), better known by his stage name Arvind Krishna, is an Indian actor working mainly in Telugu films. After completing his formal education, he made his foray into acting.

Early life and education

Arvind Krishna had spent his early years in New Delhi before moving to Europe. Arvind Krishna pursued his education in the United States from the University of Southern California - MaST (Math and Science Technology) Highly Gifted High School He then pursued BTech in Biotechnology from JNTU, Hyderabad. Arvind Krishna is an avid sportsman, played varsity basketball for his high school and United Andhra Pradesh and India, and most recently for Telangana. He was named MVP (most valuable player) of many tournaments.

Post-college education, he worked at the Satyam School of Leadership on the Leadership Development team and pursued the Global Business Leadership program with Harvard Business School and U21 Global and Satyam. He found at Satyam School of Leadership, his mentor and guru in Ed Cohen (Chief Learning Officer of Satyam at the time). Arvind attributes his professional excellence to his guru. Arvind Krishna had also acquired specialized training in Appreciative Enquiry and is a Certified facilitator for Mobile Team Challenge, both of which are programs developed by Cherri Torres and Mobile Team Challenge.

Personal life

Arvind Krishna comes from a family of bureaucrats.

Arvind got engaged to Dipika Prasad, who works in the social enterprise and impact investing space, in August 2012 and got married on 18 November 2012 at Tirumala.

Career

Arvind Krishna made his foray into acting after education. Arvind's debut movie in a supporting role Alasyam Amrutham movie a rom com starting with Happy Days fame Nikhil Siddharth and Madalasa Sharma which got poor reviews at box office. Later he starred as a main lead was  It's My Love Story. His performance in the film earned him a nomination for Best Debut Actor (Male)- Telugu at SIIMA Awards, 2012.

Arvind Krishna received a fillip in his career with Rushi, a movie produced by Prasad Productions Pvt. Ltd., which marked their comeback film after the legendary Ek Duuje Ke Liye. The film won Nandi Award for Best Story, an honor by the Appear government for cinematic excellence, in 2012. 
He played the role of an arrogant selfish medico, transforming into a doctor who goes to the extent of donating his organs to save his patient while also fighting the legal system to make it happen. This role won him critical acclaim.

Arvind is also an Indian professional basketball player & now playing for the team Hyderabad Ballers in 3x3 basketball league (3BL), India.

Arvind Krishna was most recently seen in Times Internet MX Player's original series - Lots of Love and it was MX Player's flagship product for Telugu and Tamil. 

In late 2022, director Suku Purvaj announced A Masterpiece, starring Krishna, produced by Srikanth Kandragula.

Filmography

All films are in Telugu, unless otherwise noted.

References

External links
 Arvind Krishna - FIBA profile 

Male actors from Hyderabad, India
Male actors in Telugu cinema
Indian male film actors
Male actors in Tamil cinema
21st-century Indian male actors
Indian men's basketball players
Basketball players from Telangana
Living people
1985 births
Indian emigrants to the United States
Telugu male actors